Dr. Henry Leetch House is a historic cure cottage located at Saranac Lake, town of North Elba in Essex County, New York.  It was built between 1931 and 1932 and is a two-story, wood-frame structure on a fieldstone foundation with a gable roof in the Tudor Revival style.  It features cure porch built over the garage and another at the rear of the house.  It was designed by noted local architect William L. Distin for Dr. Henry Leetch, who specialized in treating tuberculosis, and who had the disease himself.

It was listed on the National Register of Historic Places in 1992.

References

Houses on the National Register of Historic Places in New York (state)
Tudor Revival architecture in New York (state)
Houses completed in 1931
Houses in Essex County, New York
National Register of Historic Places in Essex County, New York